The Ice People may refer to:-

 The Ice People (Gee novel), novel by Maggie Gee
 The Ice People (Barjavel novel), French novel by René Barjavel
 Ice People, documentary film directed by Anne Aghion
 The Legend of the Ice People, the novel series by Margit Sandemo